Kletno  is a village in the administrative district of Gmina Stronie Śląskie, within Kłodzko County, Lower Silesian Voivodeship, in south-western Poland.

The village was founded at the end of the 16th century as Klessengrund, when the region was part of the Kingdom of Bohemia.

Among the attractions of Kletno are the Jaskinia Niedźwiedzia (Bear Cave), a museum dedicated to minerals and fossils (Muzeum Ziemi) and the former uranium mine.

Gallery

References

Kletno